Goosehill Camp is a prehistoric earthwork that dates back to the Iron Age. It consists of two concentric banks and ditches. The inner enclosure has one entrance and surround two levelled hut sites. Goosehill Camp is within the Kingley Vale National Nature Reserve, on the South Downs.

Excavations

Goosehill Camp's first recorded excavation was carried out by J. R. Boyden. This excavation was carried out between 1953 and 1955.

An excavation took place between 2008-2009 and was carried out by the University College London's Institute of Archaeology, under Mark Roberts. These excavations were complemented by a topographical survey and a magnetometry survey.

More recently, between 2014 and 2016 a field survey has been conducted, around Kingley Vale, by programme of volunteer based fieldwork, led under the guidance and support of professional archaeologists.Goosehill Camp was included in the survey.

See also
Devil's Humps, Stoughton

Notes

References

External links
 Secrets of the high woods project page

Archaeological sites in West Sussex
Iron Age sites in England
Hill forts in West Sussex